Vedran Bosnić (born 4 June 1976) is a Bosnian professional basketball coach and former player. He currently serves as the head coach for Belfius Mons-Hainaut of the Pro Basketball League.

Career achievements

As head coach
National Championships (4×):
Basketligan: 4 (with Södertälje Kings: 2012–13, 2013–14, 2014–15, 2015–16)
National Super Cups (2×):
Swiss Supercup: 2 (with Lions de Genève: 2017, 2018)
National League Cups (1×):
Swiss League Cup: 1 (with Lions de Genève: 2018 )

FIBA Europe Cup Quarterfinals (with  
Belfius Mons-Hainaut: 2021)

FIBA Qualifying for European Championships Bosnia and Herzegovina (FIBA EuroBasket) - 2022 (Record: 5-1 No.1 position)

References

3.http://www.fiba.basketball/eurobasket/2022/qualifiers/news/no-matter-the-opponent-bosnia-and-herzegovina-go-into-every-game-to-win-vedran-bosnic

External links
Vedran Bosnić at proballers.com

1976 births
Living people
Basketball players from Sarajevo
Bosnia and Herzegovina men's basketball players
Point guards
Astoria Bydgoszcz players
Bosnia and Herzegovina basketball coaches
Belfius Mons-Hainaut coaches